Lee County is the southernmost county in the U.S. state of Iowa. As of the 2020 census, the population was 33,555. The county seats are Fort Madison and Keokuk. Lee County is part of the Fort Madison–Keokuk, IA-IL-MO Micropolitan Statistical Area. It was established in 1836.

History
Fort Madison dates to the War of 1812. Lee County was the location of the Half-Breed Tract, established by treaty in 1824. Allocations of land were made to American Indian descendants of European fathers and Indian mothers at this tract. Originally the land was to be held in common. Some who had an allocation lived in cities, where they hoped to make better livings. Lee County as a named entity was formed on December 7, 1836, under the jurisdiction of Wisconsin Territory. It would become a part of Iowa Territory when it was formed on July 4, 1838. Large-scale European-American settlement in the area began in 1839, after Congress allowed owners to sell land individually. Members of the Church of Jesus Christ of Latter-day Saints (LDS Church) under the direction of Brigham Young fled persecutions in Missouri to settle in Illinois and Iowa.  Nauvoo, across the border in Hancock County, Illinois, became the main center of Latter-day Saints settlement, but there was also a Latter Day Saints stake organized in Lee County under the direction of John Smith, the uncle of Joseph Smith, land that was sold to them by Isaac Galland in 1839.

Lee has two county seats — Fort Madison and Keokuk. The latter was established in 1847 when disagreements led to a second court jurisdiction. Lee County's population grew to about 19,000 in 1850, the first US census, to 37,000 per the 3rd census in 1870, peaking at 44,000 people in 1960. It has continuously decreased since and as of 2020, 33,555 people lived there, comparable to the years between 1860 and 1870.

Name
There is no consensus about the derivation of the name "Lee." It has been variously proposed that the county was named for Marsh, Delevan & Lee, of Albany, New York, and the 'New York Land Company', who owned extensive interests in the Half-Breed Tract in the 1830s; Robert E. Lee, who surveyed the Des Moines Rapids; or Albert Lea, who helped explore the interior of Iowa.

Geography

The lowest point in the state of Iowa is located on the Mississippi River in Keokuk in Lee County, where it flows out of Iowa and into Missouri and Illinois.

Major highways
 U.S. Highway 61
 U.S. Highway 136
 U.S. Highway 218
 Iowa Highway 2
 Iowa Highway 16
 Iowa Highway 27

Transit
 Fort Madison station
 List of intercity bus stops in Iowa

Adjacent counties
Henry County (north)
Des Moines County (northeast)
Henderson County, Illinois (across the river east)
Hancock County, Illinois (southeast)
Clark County, Missouri (southwest)
Van Buren County (west)

Demographics

2020 census
There were 15,858 housing units, of which 14,036 were occupied.

2010 census
There were 16,205 housing units, of which only 14,610 were occupied.

2000 census

As of the census of 2000, there were 38,052 people, 15,161 households, and 10,248 families residing in the county. There were 16,612 housing units at an average density of 32 per square mile (12/km2). The racial makeup of the county was 94.24% White, 2.80% Black or African American, 0.26% Native American, 0.39% Asian, 0.06% Pacific Islander, 1.03% from other races, and 1.21% from two or more races.  2.37% of the population were Hispanic or Latino of any race.

There were 15,161 households, out of which 30.40% had children under the age of 18 living with them, 53.70% were married couples living together, 10.30% had a female householder with no husband present, and 32.40% were non-families. 28.30% of all households were made up of individuals, and 13.50% had someone living alone who was 65 years of age or older.  The average household size was 2.41 and the average family size was 2.93.

In the county, the population was spread out, with 24.40% under the age of 18, 7.80% from 18 to 24, 26.70% from 25 to 44, 24.60% from 45 to 64, and 16.50% who were 65 years of age or older.  The median age was 40 years. For every 100 females, there were 97.90 males.  For every 100 females age 18 and over, there were 96.40 males.

The median income for a household in the county was $36,193, and the median income for a family was $42,658. Males had a median income of $32,286 versus $21,821 for females. The per capita income for the county was $18,430.  About 7.10% of families and 9.70% of the population were below the poverty line, including 12.60% of those under age 18 and 9.60% of those age 65 or over.

Communities

Cities

Donnellson
Fort Madison
Franklin
Houghton
Keokuk
Montrose
St. Paul
West Point

Census-designated places
 Argyle 
 Denmark
 Mooar
 Sandusky
 Wever

Other unincorporated communities
 Charleston 
 Croton 
 New Boston 
 Pilot Grove

Townships

Cedar
Charleston
Denmark
Des Moines
Franklin
Green Bay
Harrison
Jackson
Jefferson
Madison
Marion
Montrose
Pleasant Ridge
Van Buren
Washington
West Point

Population ranking
The population ranking of the following table is based on the 2020 census of Lee County.

† county seat

Notable people
Cleng Peerson (1783–1865), pioneer settler in Lee County in 1840
Richard Proenneke (1916–2003), naturalist, subject of books and documentary
William Elliott Whitmore (born 1978), singer and songwriter

Politics
In recent presidential elections, Lee County had a strong Democratic lean, voting for the party's candidate in every election from 1984 to 2012. In 2016 however, the county swung hard to vote for Republican Donald Trump by a wide margin, a swing of over 31 points compared to 2012.

Education
School districts include:
 Central Lee Community School District
 Fort Madison Community School District
 Keokuk Community School District
 Mount Pleasant Community School District
 Van Buren County Community School District

Former school districts:
 Harmony Community School District

See also
National Register of Historic Places listings in Lee County, Iowa
Lee County Courthouse in use in Fort Madison, original and oldest courthouse
Lee County Courthouse in use in Keokuk, originally a Federal courthouse and post office

References

External links
Lee County government's website 

 
1836 establishments in Wisconsin Territory
Fort Madison–Keokuk, IA-IL-MO Micropolitan Statistical Area
Iowa counties on the Mississippi River
Populated places established in 1836